is a multinational fast-moving consumer goods and pharmaceutical corporation headquartered in Ikuno-ku, Osaka, Japan, with a presence in North America, Europe and Asia. The company is listed on the stock exchange, having posted steady increases in revenues from ¥95,619 million in 2006 to ¥120,292 million in 2011. Skin Care contributes to 61.3% of the revenues while Eye Care contributes to 21% of their sales.

Market Segments
Rohto is active in the three consumer segments of:
Beauty (through cosmetics)
Health (through food supplements)
Healing (through over-the-counter drugs)

International presence
In 1974, Rohto set its eyes on The Mentholatum Company. In August 1975, it acquired the trademark rights to Mentholatum and began to sell the Mentholatum Ointment and Mentholatum Medicated Lip Stick, which proved to be a financial success as the company's revenue skyrocketed to ¥2.64 billion by April 1981. Rohto Pharmaceutical Co. continued to acquire the management rights to The Mentholatum Company Inc in June 1988, thus completing the merge.

Rohto group has established operations in 15 major markets, with marketing/distribution agreements in more than 150 countries globally. They have two production plants in Japan and 6 production plants across US, UK, China, Vietnam, Hong Kong and Indonesia.

Rohto entered the Vietnam market in 1997 and set up their manufacturing base to cater to the Asia Pacific market. In mid-2010, Rohto entered the India market and started operations in the lipcare and skin care segment, with their internationally popular brands, Lipice and Oxy. Simultaneously they also entered the Bangladesh market.

With a strong presence across international markets, the company has a manpower strength of close to 5000 employees.

 founded "", the predecessor of Rohto, in Shimizucho, Higashi-ku (present: Shinsaibashi, Chuo-ku), Osaka on February 22, 1899. Yamada sold "Rohto Eyedrops" in 1909.

Brands
Lipice: The best selling Lip Care line in Japan, China, HK, Taiwan, Vietnam, Malaysia, Singapore, Thailand & Indonesia.
Oxy B: Anti-acne products(acquired the OXY Skin Care branding from GlaxoSmithKline in December 2005)
Rohto Eyedrops: including the highly acclaimed Rohto Zi (Awarded "Best New Eyecare Product" in the 1999 Superdrug Health & Beauty Awards)
Sunplay: Full range of sunscreen daily sun care and after sun products providing best UV protection for different outdoor occasions
BodyIce: Deodorant roll-on and mists
Mentholatum: Full range of Men's skin care for face and body
Selsun: Anti-dandruff shampoo
Acnelogy: pimples treatment (Acne + Dermatology. It includes 3 skincare steps (Conditioning Foam, Acne Care Lotion, Concentrate Essence)

Head Office and Subsidiaries
Rohto Pharmaceutical Co., Ltd. (Japan - Parent Company)
Mentholatum Australasia Pty. Ltd.(Australia)
The Mentholatum Company Ltd. (UK)
The Mentholatum Company of (Canada), Limited
The Mentholatum (China) Pharmaceuticals Co., Ltd.
Mentholatum Asia Pacific Ltd. (Hong Kong)
Rohto Pharma (India) Private Limited
Mentholatum de (Mexico), S.A. de C.V.
Mentholatum (South Africa) Pty. Ltd.
Mentholatum Taiwan Ltd. (Taiwan)
PT Rohto Laboratories (Indonesia)
Rohto-Mentholatum (Vietnam) Co., Ltd.
Rohto-Mentholatum (Malaysia) SDN BHD.
Rohto-Mentholatum (Thailand) Ltd.
Rohto-Mentholatum (Bangladesh) Limited
Dax Cosmetics Sp. z o.o. (Poland) Limited

Notes

External links
Rohto global website 
Rohto Products Information/樂敦產品中文介紹 
Rohto eyedrops website

 
Companies listed on the Osaka Exchange
Pharmaceutical companies of Japan
Companies based in Osaka Prefecture
Japanese companies established in 1899
Pharmaceutical companies established in 1899
Cosmetics companies of Japan
Personal care companies
Eyewear companies of Japan
Companies listed on the Tokyo Stock Exchange
Japanese brands
1960s initial public offerings